The 2002–03 UEFA Futsal Cup was the 17th edition of Europe's premier club futsal tournament and the 2nd edition under the current UEFA Futsal Cup format.

First qualifying round

Group 1

Group 2

Group 3

Group 4

Group 5

Group 6

Group 7

Group 8

Second qualifying round

Group A

Group B

Finals

The 2003 UEFA Futsal Cup Final was played  on April 16, 2003 at the La Garenne in Charleroi, Belgium and  May 3, 2003 at the Pabellón Ciudad de Castellón in Castellón, Spain. Playas de Castellón won 7–5 on aggregate.

External links
 uefa.com

UEFA Futsal Champions League
Cup